Oxynoidae is a family of sea snails, bubble snails, marine gastropod mollusks in the superfamily Oxynooidea, an opisthobranch group.

This family has no subfamilies.

Genera
The following three genera  or four are included in the family Oxynoidae:
 Lobiger Krohn, 1847
 Lophopleurella Zilch, 1956 with the only species in the genus: Lophopleurella capensis (Thiele, 1912) from South Africa
 Oxynoe Rafinesque, 1814
 Roburnella Marcus, 1982 with the only species Roburnella wilsoni (Tate, 1889)

Invalid taxa placed in Oxynoidae include:
 Icarus gravesii Forbes, 1844 - type locality: Aegean Sea
 Lophocercus krohnii A. Adams, 1854 - type locality: Hawaiian Islands :
 Lophocercus sieboldii Krohn, 1847 - type locality: Messina, Italy : synonym of Oxynoe olivacea Rafinesque, 1814
 Lophocercus viridis Pease, 1861 : synonym of Oxynoe viridis (Pease, 1861)

References